Syllabograms are signs used to write the syllables (or morae) of words.  This term is most often used in the context of a writing system otherwise organized on different principles—an alphabet where most symbols represent phonemes, or a logographic script where most symbols represent morphemes—but a system based mostly on syllabograms is a syllabary.

Syllabograms in the Maya script most frequently take the form of V (vowel) or CV (consonant-vowel) syllables of which approximately 83 are known. CVC signs are present as well. Two modern well-known examples of syllabaries consisting mostly of CV syllabograms are the Japanese kana, used to represent the same sounds in different occasions.  Syllabograms tend not to be used for languages with more complicated syllables: for example English phonotactics allows syllables as complex as CCCVCCCC (as in  strengths), generating many thousands of possible syllables and making the use of syllabograms cumbersome.

Types of writing system that use syllabograms
Syllabary
Semi-syllabary

References

Writing systems